"Autofac" is a 1955 science fiction short story by American writer Philip K. Dick that features one of the earliest treatments of self-replicating machines (and Dick's second, after his 1953 short story Second Variety). It appeared originally in Galaxy Science Fiction of November 1955, and was reprinted in several collections, including The Variable Man published in 1957, and Robots, Androids, and Mechanical Oddities published in 1984.

The story was adapted by Travis Beacham for an episode of the 2017 TV series, Philip K. Dick's Electric Dreams.

Plot summary
Three men wait outside their settlement for an automated delivery truck. Five years earlier, during the Total Global Conflict, a network of hardened automatic factories ("autofacs") had been set up with cybernetic controls that determine what food and consumer goods to manufacture and deliver. Human input had been lost, and the men planned disruption to try to establish communication and take over control. They destroy the delivery, but the truck radios the autofac and unloads an identical replacement, then prevents them from reloading items. They act out being disgusted with the milk delivery and are given a complaints checklist. In a blank space, they write improvised semantic garble—"the product is thoroughly pizzled". The autofac sends a humanoid data collector that communicates on an oral basis, but is not capable of conceptual thought, and they are unable to persuade the network to shut down before it consumes all resources. Their next strategy sets neighbouring autofacs in competition with each other for rare resources and seemingly succeeds, but there is a hidden level.

Translations
French: "Le Règne des robots", anonymous, August 1956, in "Galaxie Anticipation" issue 33

Television version
The TV series Philip K. Dick's Electric Dreams includes a one-hour episode based on the story, with considerable differences in the plot and outcome.

References

External links
"Autofac" at the Internet Archive

Short stories by Philip K. Dick
1955 short stories
Self-replicating machines in fiction
Post-apocalyptic short stories
Short stories about robots